This article is about the American Billboard Hot 100 chart held during the 1990s.

The Billboard Hot 100 chart is the main song chart of the American music industry and is updated every week by the Billboard magazine. During the 1990s the chart was based collectively on each single's weekly physical sales figures and airplay on American radio stations.

The methodology for determining sales and airplay figures drastically changed with the chart dated November 30, 1991. Instead of surveying retail stores and radio stations, sales data was now gathered by Soundscan via a collection of the number of barcode scans a record received while airplay was to be compiled by Broadcast Data Systems, which continuously monitored what songs were being played on radio. As the decade progressed, a growing trend in the music industry was to promote songs to radio without the release of a commercially-available singles in an attempt by record companies to boost albums sales. Because such a release was required to chart on the Hot 100, many popular songs that were hits on top 40 radio never made it onto the chart. Beginning December 5, 1998, the Hot 100 changed from being a "singles" chart to a "songs" chart. Not only did Billboard start allowing airplay-only tracks to chart, it broadened its radio panel to include "R&B, adult R&B, mainstream rock, triple-A rock, and country outlets", which was formerly "confined to the mainstream top 40, rhythmic top 40, adult top 40, adult contemporary, and modern rock formats."

"Another Day in Paradise" by Phil Collins began the 1990s in the number-one position, spending the first two weeks of the decade on top, but its first week at number one was on the chart dated December 23, 1989. Santana's "Smooth" featuring Rob Thomas finished the decade and began the next with a 12-week run atop the Hot 100.

Number ones 
Key
 – Number-one single of the year

Statistics by decade

Artists by total number-one singles 
The following artists achieved three or more number-one hits during the 1990s. A number of artists had number-one singles on their own as well as part of a collaboration.

Artists by total number of weeks at number-one 
The following artists were featured in top of the chart for the highest total number of weeks during the 1990s.

Songs by total number of weeks at number-one 
The following songs were featured in top of the chart for the highest total number of weeks during the 1990s.

 "Smooth" by Santana featuring Rob Thomas spent 12 consecutive weeks at number one, on the charts dated from October 23, 1999 to January 8, 2000. Its reign at the top of the Hot 100 extended into the 2000s by two weeks, so only 10 of its weeks occurred in the 1990s, making it fall short of the 10 longest running number-ones in the 1990s if going strictly by its weeks at number one during the decade.

See also
 List of UK Singles Chart number ones of the 1990s
 List of number-one hits (United States)
 1990s in music

References

United States Hot 100
 1990s